Broadwath is a hamlet in the City of Carlisle district, in the English county of Cumbria. Broadwath is on Cairn Beck. Nearby settlements include the villages of Wetheral, Warwick Bridge, Great Corby and Heads Nook.

See also

Listed buildings in Wetheral

References 

 Broadwath website

Hamlets in Cumbria
Wetheral